SOTUS: The Series (SOTUS: The Series – ,  SOTUS: The Series – The Evil Senior and Mr. Freshman) is a 2016–2017 Thai television series starring Perawat Sangpotirat (Krist) and Prachaya Ruangroj (Singto). It is an adaptation of the novel SOTUS: พี่ว้ากตัวร้ายกับนายปีหนึ่ง by Bittersweet. The title SOTUS refers to the  system which Kongphop (Prachaya Ruangroj) and his fellow freshmen have to undergo to be recognized by the hazing team, led by third-year student Arthit (Perawat Sangpotirat), as their official junior students. As the activities unfold, the two groups go through a series of conflicts and reconciling, and the friendship and love among them gradually flourish.

Directed by Lit Samajarn and produced by GMMTV together with Felloww, the series was one of the two television series announced by GMMTV in early 2016 along with Senior Secret Love. It premiered on One31 and LINE TV on 20 August 2016, airing on Saturdays at 22:00 ICT and 24:00 ICT, respectively. The first eight episodes aired between 20 August 2016 and 8 October 2016. After the passing of Thai King Bhumibol Adulyadej, the series was ordered to stop airing during the 30-day official mourning period. The remaining eight episodes were eventually shown between 19 November 2016 and 7 January 2017, effectively delaying the finale from its originally intended air date of 3 December 2016. On 14 January 2017, a special episode aired entitled SOTUS: Very Special EP, which featured never-before-seen and behind-the-scene scenes.

In early March 2017, a sequel of the series entitled SOTUS S: The Series was announced where both Perawat and Prachaya will reprise their roles. The sequel premiered on 9 December 2017 and was followed by a spin-off on Our Skyy (2018).

Synopsis 
The "Gear" – or cogwheel – is the symbol of the Faculty of Engineering. It is part of a system of cogwheels which power and run a device (e.g. a clock). If one gear fails, the device stops working. Wearing the "Gear" symbol signifies being a student of the Faculty of Engineering. Third year senior student Arthit (Perawat Sangpotirat) is the head hazer who leads the hazing team in disciplining the freshmen students by following the code of the S.O.T.U.S system. His methods were misunderstood by the students as a form of abusing his power as head hazer when in fact all he wanted is for the freshmen to get to know their seniors, rely on them when they need to and vice versa. The freshmen students felt they are powerless to complain or resist any orders given to them by their seniors. Arthit was seemingly unstoppable, until Kongphop (Prachaya Ruangroj) stood up against him. This initially resulted in a strained relationship between Kongphop and Arthit. However, continuous encounters between the two helped transform their relationship into something much more affectionate.

Cast and characters

Main

Supporting

Episodes

Soundtrack 
The soundtrack of the series includes two original songs, five featured songs, and some 70 licensed tracks as background music. The numbers in parentheses indicate the episode(s) where the tracks are used.

Original songs

Featured songs

Background music

Season 2 (2017) 

Due to its popularity, a second season was announced with both Prachaya Ruangroj and Perawat Sangpotirat reprising their roles. Titled Sotus S: The Series, it premiered on 9 December 2017 and picks up after the events of the first season with Arthit now working in an office and Kongphop becoming the head hazer of the Faculty of Engineering.

Awards and nominations

Notes

References

External links 
 SOTUS: The Series on GMM 25 website 
 SOTUS: The Series  on LINE TV
 
 GMMTV

Thai boys' love television series
2016 Thai television series debuts
2017 Thai television series endings
2010s college television series
Television series by GMMTV
One 31 original programming
2010s LGBT-related drama television series